Karan Singh Dalal (born 06/07/1957) is a member of the Haryana Legislative Assembly from the Indian National Congress representing the Palwal Vidhan sabha Constituency in Haryana. He is a five time MLA. The firebrand congress leader lost to Subhash Chaudhary of INLD in 2009 assembly elections. He was elected for the first time in 1991 on HVP ticket. Then reelected in 1996 and became minister in the cabinet of the then chief minister. He was also elected as the first chairman of Haryana administrative reform commission.

References 

1950 births
Living people
Members of the Haryana Legislative Assembly
Indian National Congress politicians from Haryana
Haryana Vikas Party politicians
People from Sonipat district
Republican Party of India politicians